Tibatan (also Romanized as Tībātān and Tībatān) is a village in Targavar Rural District, Silvaneh District, Urmia County, West Azerbaijan Province, Iran. At the 2006 census, its population was 341, in 61 families.

References 

Populated places in Urmia County